Georgia Adderley (born 8 January 2001) is a Scottish female professional squash player. She reached her highest career singles ranking of 58 in September 2022 during the ongoing 2022 PSA World Tour. As of 19th September 2022, she is ranked 58 according to the PSA World rankings.

References

External links 

 

2001 births
Living people
Scottish female squash players
Sportspeople from Edinburgh